Macarostola polyplaca is a moth of the family Gracillariidae. It is found in Queensland and New South Wales, Australia.

The larvae feed on Lophostemon confertus and Tristania suaveolens. They probably mine the leaves of their host plant.

References

External links
images at boldsystems.org

Macarostola
Moths described in 1894